Colette Caple (born 3 July 1973) is a British former professional tennis player. During her career she was known as Colette Hall.

Raised in the town of Weymouth in Dorset, Hall competed on the professional tennis circuit in the early 1990s, reaching a best singles ranking of 322 in the world.

Hall twice competed as a wildcard in the singles main draw at Wimbledon, losing in the first round to 12th seed Katerina Maleeva in 1992, then Larisa Neiland in 1993.

ITF finals

Singles (0–1)

Doubles (0–1)

References

External links
 
 

1973 births
Living people
British female tennis players
Sportspeople from Weymouth
English female tennis players